Ara: History Untold is an upcoming turn-based grand strategy video game being developed by Oxide Games and published by Xbox Game Studios. The game was announced during Xbox and Bethesda Showcase 2022. It is about building and leading a nation throughout alternate history. The game is set to release Q1/Q2 of 2023 for Microsoft Windows.

The game is being developed by Oxide Games, an American video game developer based in Lutherville-Timonium, Maryland, using their in-house engine, Nitrous Engine, which was used to develop Ashes of the Singularity.

Some Oxide Game members used to work at Firaxis Games, the development studio of the Civilization franchise, Ara: History Untold in many ways is similar to this series.

References

External links

Upcoming video games scheduled for 2023
Video games developed in the United States
Windows games
Windows-only games
Oxide Games games